This is a list of members of the Australian Senate from 1951 to 1953. The 28 April 1951 election was a double dissolution called by Prime Minister of Australia Robert Menzies in an attempt to gain control of the Senate and to pass the Commonwealth Bank Bill, if necessary at a joint sitting of both houses.  All 121 seats in the House of Representatives, and all 60 seats in the Senate were up for election. The incumbent Liberal Party of Australia led by Menzies with coalition partner the Country Party led by Arthur Fadden defeated the Australian Labor Party led by Ben Chifley and gained control of the Senate with 32 seats to Labor's 28.

In accordance with section 13 of the Constitution, terms for senators was taken to commence on 1 July 1950.  The first five senators elected in each state were allocated the full six-year terms ending on 30 June 1956 while the other half were allocated three-year terms ending on 30 June 1953.

The Commonwealth Bank Bill was presented to Parliament again on 26 June 1951 and passed both houses.

Notes

References

Members of Australian parliaments by term
20th-century Australian politicians
Australian Senate lists